Winge is a surname. Notable people with the surname include:

Axel Winge (1827–1893), Norwegian businessman and politician
Hanna Winge (1838–1896), Swedish painter
Herluf Winge (1857–1923), Danish zoologist
Mårten Eskil Winge (1825–1896), Swedish artist
Øjvind Winge (1886–1964), Danish biologist and a pioneer in yeast genetics
Oluf Winge (1855–1889), Danish zoologist
Per Winge (1858–1935), Norwegian conductor, pianist and composer
Ralph M. Winge (1925–2020), American politician
Sigurd Winge (1909–1970), Norwegian painter and visual artist
Stein Winge (born 1940), Norwegian stage producer, theatre director and actor
Viktoria Winge (born 1980), Norwegian actress

See also
Stephan Schulz-Winge (born 1974), German footballer